Art of War Undisputed Arena Fighting Championship: Art of War GIs vs Pros was the fifth mixed martial arts event by the mixed martial arts organization Art of War Undisputed Arena Fighting Championship. The event took place on Saturday, April 19, 2008 at the Grand Casino Tunica in Tunica, Mississippi.  The card was air on Fox Sports Net (FSN).

History 
The fight card included James Damien Stelly and Ron Faircloth in the main event. The show also featured a bout between Mike Wessel and Patrick Castillo. This card featured military (active or former) veterans pitted against MMA professionals.

Results

References 

2007 in sports
Mixed martial arts events
Mixed martial arts in Mississippi
2007 in mixed martial arts